Pagine Gialle is the second live album released by German Clarinet Duo.

Track listing
Pagine Gialle, Pt. 1  -   9:31
Pagine Gialle, Pt. 2	 - 15:37
Pagine Gialle, Pt. 3	 - 11:32
Pagine Gialle, Pt. 4	 -   9:08
Pagine Gialle, Pt. 5	 -   5:35

Personnel

Theo Jörgensmann - clarinet
Eckard Koltermann - bass clarinet

References 

2001 live albums
German Clarinet Duo albums